Opa-locka  is a city in Miami-Dade County, Florida, United States. As of the 2020 census, the population was 16,463, up from 15,219 in 2010. The city was developed by Glenn Curtiss. Developed based on a One Thousand and One Nights theme, Opa-locka has the largest collection of Moorish Revival architecture in the Western Hemisphere, and streets with such names as Sharazad Boulevard, Sinbad Avenue, Sabur Lane, Sultan Avenue, Ali Baba Avenue, Perviz Avenue, and Sesame Street.

The name Opa-locka is an abbreviation of a Seminole place name, spelled Opa-tisha-wocka-locka (or Opatishawockalocka), meaning "wooded hummock" or "high, dry hummock."

History
Opa-locka was founded by aviation pioneer Glenn Curtiss in 1926. Curtiss developed the city with a Moorish architecture theme. While the 1926 Miami hurricane badly damaged the city and brought the Florida land boom to a halt, several Moorish-style buildings survived. Twenty of the original Moorish Revival architecture buildings have been listed on the National Register of Historic Places as part of the Opa-locka Thematic Resource Area.

Amelia Earhart launched her historic trip around the world from Miami Municipal Airport, located at the time in what is now the southern part of Opa-locka. The German dirigible Graf Zeppelin visited Naval Air Station Miami, which later became Opa-locka Airport, as a regular stop on its Germany-Brazil-United States-Germany scheduled route.

In the 1950s, the Opa-locka airport—specifically Building 67—became the site of a large CIA operation, PBSuccess, run by operatives including E. Howard Hunt. The operation helped launch the U.S.-led coup in Guatemala in 1954 and was a precursor to the Bay of Pigs Invasion in 1961. The airfield center then served as a listening post for Cuba until the 82nd Airborne took over Opa-locka Airbase during the Cuban Missile Crisis.

In the 1980s, Opa-locka transitioned from majority white to majority African-American and was seen as a pioneer in black empowerment in northern Dade County where neighboring cities (North Miami, North Miami Beach, Miami Gardens, and Golden Glades) were undergoing a similar racial shift. In 1943, Opa-Locka hired its first Black police officer. In 1972, the first Black City Commissioner was elected, Albert Tresvant, who then went on to serve as the first Black mayor of Opa-Locka in 1975.

The city was the first community in the United States to commemorate the first African-American president of the United States. A mile-long section of Perviz Avenue—from Oriental Boulevard to Ali Baba Avenue—was renamed Barack Obama Avenue on February 17, 2009.
 
In addition to the unique buildings, Opa-locka has a large general aviation airport, three parks, two lakes and a railroad station which is currently the tri-rail station. The city is a mixture of residential, commercial and industrial zones. The city was the backdrop for the making of movies such as Salesman, "Living Dreams", Texas Justice, Bad Boys II and 2 Fast 2 Furious.

2016 financial emergency
On June 1, 2016, Florida Governor Rick Scott issued Executive Order Number 16-135, declaring the City of Opa-Locka to be in a state of "Financial Emergency" under Florida Statute Section 218.503. According to the Executive Order, the Opa-Locka City Commission requested that the governor declare the financial emergency, the state and the City of Opa-Locka were to execute a State and Local Agreement of Cooperation, and the government would appoint a Financial Emergency Board. On the same day, the Miami Herald reported that "Millions of dollars are in arrears as the city teeters on the edge of bankruptcy" and that "city officials remain under an FBI corruption investigation". The article also reported that this financial emergency was the second declared for the city since 2002.

Just over a week earlier, Opa-locka Commissioner Terence Pinder apparently drove his SUV into a tree at high speed, killing himself. He was scheduled to turn himself over to prosecutors the next day, having faced bribery charges.

On June 10, Governor Scott named the Financial Emergency Board. The City of Opa-locka does not have an Audit Committee to help select the public accountant to perform the independent audited financial statements, as required by Florida Statute  218.391 (2)

Geography
It is bordered to the north by the city of Miami Gardens, to the east by unincorporated Golden Glades, to the south by unincorporated Westview, and to the southwest by the city of Hialeah.

Climate

Surrounding areas
    Miami Gardens
  Miami Lakes    Golden Glades
Unincorporated Miami-Dade County   Golden Glades
 Hialeah    North Miami
 Hialeah, Westview

Demographics

2020 census

Note: the US Census treats Hispanic/Latino as an ethnic category. This table excludes Latinos from the racial categories and assigns them to a separate category. Hispanics/Latinos can be of any race

2010 United States Census

As of 2010, there were 5,966 households, out of which 14.8% were vacant. In 2000, 41.2% had children under the age of 18 living with them, 28.4% were married couples living together, 35.2% had a female householder with no husband present, and 29.7% were non-families. 24.8% of all households were made up of individuals, and 8.5% had someone living alone who was 65 years of age or older. The average household size was 2.97 and the average family size was 3.52.

2000 United States Census
In 2000, the city's population was distributed as  34.6% under the age of 18, 12.3% from 18 to 24, 26.8% from 25 to 44, 17.7% from 45 to 64, and 8.5% who were 65 years of age or older. The median age was 27 years. For every 100 females, there were 85.6 males. For every 100 females age 18 and over, there were 77.1 males.

In 2000, $25,000 was the median income for a family. Males had a median income of $22,347 versus $19,270 for females. The per capita income for the city is approximately $15,000. About 31.5% of families and 35.2% of the population are below the poverty line, including 42.3% of those under age 18 and 40.8% of those age 65 or over.

As of 2000, speakers of English as a first language accounted for 68.45%, while Spanish made up 28.30%, French Creole 2.78%, and French was at 0.48% of the population.

Government
The city of Opa-locka was incorporated in 1926, and operates under a commission/city manager form of government. The city commission consists of the mayor and four commissioners, who are responsible for enacting ordinances, resolutions, and regulations governing the city, and appointing the members of various advisory boards, the city manager, city attorney, and city clerk.  As chief administrative officer, the city manager is responsible for the enforcement of laws and ordinances, and the appointment and supervision of the city's department heads. Municipal services include police, sanitation, water and sewer services, storm water services, maintenance of streets and infrastructure, and recreational activities.  The financial reporting entity, under which the financial statements are prepared, includes all the activities and functions for which the city is financially accountable.

The federal government has been investigating the city's government since at least 2013. In 2014, auditors reported that basic bookkeeping was non-existent. The Miami Herald reported the mayor and other officials were using city funds for their own benefit. In 2016, the city manager and public works supervisor were arrested, charged with extortion of money in exchange for city permits. Both quickly pled guilty.  The city's water system had been used by city workers as means of collecting money for their own use. In August 2016 the city asked the county to take over the system.

Police
In 2022, the city hired Broward County law enforcement officer Scott Israel as its Police Chief, replacing acting police chief Michael Steel, who had been in the position since Steve Barreira resigned in late October 2021 after just months on the job. In 2019, Israel In a 2013 editorial, the Miami Herald called the city "crime-plagued" and the police department "deeply troubled". Florida Governor Ron DeSantis suspended Israel from his Broward County position in 2019 (replacing him with Gregory Tony) citing Israel's responses to the Fort Lauderdale airport shooting and the Stoneman Douglas High School shooting. Israel appealed his removal to the Florida Senate. The Senate appointed former Senate President J. Dudley Goodlette (R) to serve as special master to hear the testimony and evidence. After conducting a trial, Goodlette issued his report in September 2019, finding the removal was improper and recommending Israel be reinstated. Bob Gualtieri, chairman of the panel investigating the Parkland shooting and sheriff of Pinellas County, said he didn’t think Israel should be suspended: "He had some personnel that failed. Any law enforcement organization is going to have people that fail. And just because individuals fail doesn’t mean that the leader of the organization is a failure.” Despite the special master report and recommendation, however, the Florida Senate held a special session on October 23, 2019, and voted 25–15 to uphold the suspension.

Crime
In 2004, Opa-locka had the highest rate of violent crime for any city in the United States. Calvin Godfrey wrote, in a 2009 Miami New Times article, that Opa-locka was "mired in crime and sinking fast." He wrote that the police department, whose headcount had decreased from 50 to 16, had been "steadily deteriorating" for the 20-year period leading up to 2009. The Miami New Times received memorandums that, in Godfrey's words, "reveal an agency rife with controversy". 

In January 2005, after negative Florida Department of Law Enforcement evaluations of the Opa-locka police force surfaced, the Miami-Dade Police Department sent county commissioner Barbara Jordan a report that projected it would cost $7 million per period to take over the Opa-locka police duties. In 2005, Opa-locka allocated $3.5 million to its officers. Jannie Beverly, Opa-locka's city manager, fired police chief James Wright in January 2008 after he was accused of corruption. In a 2013 editorial, the Miami Herald called the city "crime-plagued" and the police department "deeply troubled".

According to press reports in late 2011, local officer German Bosque led the state in the number of complaints and internal investigations of his activities. In 18 years, he had been the subject of 40 internal investigations, 16 for excessive force. During his career he had been fired five times and arrested three times.

Opa-locka crime statistics reported an overall downward trend in crime based on data from 12 years, with both violent crime and property crime decreasing. Based on this trend, the crime rate in Opa-locka for 2013 was expected to be lower than in 2010.

Education

Miami-Dade County Public Schools serves Opa-locka.

Dr. Robert B. Ingram/Opa-locka Elementary School is located in Opa-locka. North Dade Middle School in Miami Gardens and Hialeah/Miami Lakes Senior High in Hialeah serve the city.

Library
The Opa-locka Branch library is one of the 50 branches included within the Miami-Dade Public Library System. This branch is open to the public on weekdays offering an After School Club and Storytime for children.

Religion
Opa-locka had 30 houses of worship in 1996. During that year, Oscar Musibay of the Miami New Times said, "Like South Beach has hotels, Opa-locka has churches."

Transportation

Opa-locka is served by Opa-locka Executive Airport, owned and operated by the Miami-Dade County Aviation Department. Additionally, Opa-locka is served by Miami-Dade Transit buses and by Tri-Rail via the Opa-locka Station.

In popular culture
 The sequence in the 1964 James Bond movie Goldfinger in which CIA agent Felix Leiter is tailing Oddjob, who is driving Mr. Solo to the airport, was filmed in Opa-Locka.
 Opa-locka is featured in the landmark 1969 documentary film Salesman, by the Maysles Brothers.
 In 1970, Mary Ann Vecchio, a teenaged runaway from Opa-locka, was in Kent, Ohio, on the day of the Kent State shootings on May 4, 1970.  The image of Vecchio, kneeling by the body of a slain Kent State student, taken by Greensburg Tribune-Review freelancer John Filo, later won a Pulitzer Prize.
Opa-Loka is the title of a song on the 1975 album Warrior on the Edge of Time by the British band Hawkwind.
 In the 1991 film Soapdish, the leading character, played by Kevin Kline, is a down-and-out actor reduced to drunkenly performing the role of Willy Loman in the play Death of a Salesman at the fictitious "Opa-Locka Dinner Theater."
 Opa-locka is mentioned in the 1995 action movie The Substitute by a black student who is being disciplined by Tom Berenger.

Notable people
 Brisco, rapper
 Harry Wayne Casey, singer
 Dalvin Cook, NFL player
 Rohan Davey, NFL player
 Thad Lewis, NFL player
 Yung Miami, hip hop singer
 Montel Vontavious Porter, professional wrestler
 Aurin Squire, playwright

References

External links

 
 Dr. Robert B. Ingram/Opa-locka Elementary School

 
Cities in Florida
Cities in Miami-Dade County, Florida
Moorish Revival architecture in Florida
Planned cities in the United States
Planned communities in Florida
Cities in Miami metropolitan area
1926 establishments in Florida
Populated places established in 1926